Imortal is a Philippine television drama produced by ABS-CBN starring John Lloyd Cruz and Angel Locsin. This series was aired from October 4, 2010 to April 29, 2011, and was replaced by I Am Legend from May 2 to July 8, 2011. It is the sequel to the 2008 fantasy series Lobo.

The series is streaming online on YouTube.

Plot

Prequel

Imortal is a sequel to the 2008 ABS-CBN fantasy series, Lobo. The previous series also starred Angel Locsin and Piolo Pascual. However, Lobo story-wise only included werewolves without any reference to vampires. Locsin's character in Imortal is the daughter of her character in Lobo.

Synopsis
In 1572, a group of powerful beings arrive in Philippine shores. Known as vampires, drinkers of human blood, their menace quickly spreads throughout the land. But unknown to them, a powerful clan of Shapeshifters also live in the islands, a group of beings who can transform themselves into powerful wolves - the Taong Lobos.

The Taong Lobos were the humans' protectors and together the two species form an army to destroy the vampires. The blood drinkers were no match to the Taong Lobos. One by one, they fell. Those who survive go into hiding. Peace prevail among the humans and Taong Lobos, and the memory of the vampires fade. Around this time, the Taong Lobos deal with a crisis of their own giving way to the events of the first series of this trilogy, Lobo.

Unbeknownst to them, the vampires lay dormant for a reason – organizing and fortifying their numbers until they are ready. They hold a dangerous secret: a prophecy, foretelling an epic battle between vampires and the Taong Lobos that will ultimately decide the fate of their respective bloodlines. The battle shall be led by a powerful vampire and a powerful werewolf who are each other's nemesis and downfall. The vampires believe they have found their prophesied savior and are now preparing for the war to come. Meanwhile, the Taong Lobos have grown complacent and know nothing about the prophecy.

With the stage set for an epic battle, two individuals: Mateo (John Lloyd Cruz) and Lia (Angel Locsin) find themselves drawn to each other. As they grow closer, they unknowingly awaken the powers that are lying dormant within them - the same powers that will inevitably tear them apart.

Episodes

Cast and characters

Main cast

Supporting cast

Guest cast
 Angel Locsin as Lyka Blancaflor Raymundo-Ortega†
 Piolo Pascual as Noah Ortega†
 Mark Gil as Julio
 Kalila Aguilos as Barang
 Carlos Morales as Lyndon
 Christian Vasquez as Badong / Luis Cristobal
 Archie Alemania as Arturo Lumibao
Dean de Jesus as vampire
 Danillo Barrios as Billy Villareal
 Menggie Cobarrubias as Jessie Cordero
 Manuel Aquino as Albert Esguerra
 Josh Ivan Morales as Benezor
 Angelo Garcia as Andoy
 Manuel Chua as Diego
 Kris Martinez as Francis
 Gerard Acao as Macoy
 Zeppi Borromeo as Baldo
 Thou Reyes as Rafael
 Andre Tiangco as Atty. Yumul
 Hermes Bautista as Taong Lobo
 David Chua as Taong Lobo
 Kevin Paul Lavarias as Taong Lobo
 Marion Dela Cruz as Taong Lobo
 Gem Ramos as Taong Lobo
 RJ Calipus as Taong Lobo
 Kristel Moreno as Severina
 Tyron Perez as Vampire
 Helga Krapf as Vampire
 Rob Stumvoll as Vampire
 Princess Manzon as Vampire
 Yuri Okawa as Vampire
 Rommel Velasquez as Waya Leo
 Allyson Lualhati as young Tabitha Matute
 Alwyn Uytingco as young Julio
 Matthew Mendoza as young Simon Teodoro
 Sheree Bautista as young Lucille Zaragosa
 Epy Quizon as young Abraham Villamor
 Precious Lara Quigaman as Ceres
 Justin Cuyugan as Alfredo
 Sajj Geronimo as young Lia
 Jairus Aquino as young Mateo (1st generation)
 Bugoy Cariño as young Mateo (2nd generation)
 Marites Juaquin as Darla†, Samantha's mother

Reception

Ratings
On March 7, 2011, it was moved to a later timeslot to give way to Minsan Lang Kita Iibigin. Because of this, the show's ratings dropped to an average of more than 20 million viewers nightly from having more than 30 million viewers.

Launch
Imortal was launched as part of the half-term show line-up by ABS-CBN, launched as part of the 60th Anniversary of Philippine Soap Opera. The production of the series started In 2010.

Promotion

DVD
The DVD series is internationally distributed to Volumes 1-13 containing all episodes.

Pangil: The teleserye-based RPG
Pangil (fangs) is an online role-playing game created in relation to the television show and was released before the premiere of the series was launched. The role-playing game involves around the character of Samantha (played by Maricar Reyes in the series) and players instruct her on her quest as she defeats the enemies. The locations on the game were also based on real locations in the Philippines such as Intramuros, Quiapo and Binondo.

The Hidden Chapters of Imortal: Anino't Panaginip
A series of webisodes were also released on the official website entitled Anino't Panaginip (Shadows and Dreams). It consists of 5 minute long episodes that were unreleased on television and was released every week as the series premieres. There are currently 24 webisodes.

Sequel

A sequel to the Moonstone series entitled La Luna Sangre, starring Kathryn Bernardo, Daniel Padilla and Richard Gutierrez premiered on June 19, 2017. The sequel series was first revealed at the company's trade launch on November 22, 2016.

Awards and nominations

See also
Lobo
La Luna Sangre
List of programs broadcast by ABS-CBN
List of vampire television series
Vampire films

References

External links
Official website

ABS-CBN drama series
Apocalyptic television series
Philippine action television series
Philippine horror fiction television series
Fantaserye and telefantasya
Vampires in television
Television about werewolves
Television series by Star Creatives
2010 Philippine television series debuts
2011 Philippine television series endings
Filipino-language television shows
Television shows set in the Philippines